USS Hermitage (LSD-34) was a  of the United States Navy. She was named for The Hermitage, President Andrew Jackson's estate just outside Nashville, Tennessee.

Hermitage was laid down on 11 April 1955, by the Ingalls Shipbuilding Corp., Pascagoula, Miss.; launched on 12 June 1956; sponsored by Mrs. Alfred M. Pride, wife of Vice Admiral Alfred M. Pride, and commissioned on 14 December 1956.

Service history
While on shakedown in the Caribbean, Hermitage was informally inspected by Admiral Arleigh Burke, then Chief of Naval Operations. After training operations out of Naval Station Norfolk, she sailed for the Mediterranean Sea in late August to join the 6th Fleet. Hermitage participated in exercises with NATO units and visited Sicily, Crete, Turkey, Italy, Greece, and Spain before returning to the States on 16 November 1957. Operations primarily with fast amphibious helicopter assault equipment and tactics occupied her until November 1959. With a cargo of Presidential helicopters embarked, Hermitage sailed to Karachi on 2 December via the Atlantic, Mediterranean, Suez Canal, and Red and Arabian seas to furnish transportation for President Dwight D. Eisenhower on his Asian and European tour. Mission successfully completed, she returned home via Barcelona on 17 January 1960.

Hermitage sailed on 28 November as flagship for Admiral A. L. Reed, COMSOLANT, for a good will cruise to South America and Africa. In the midst of this important cruise, Hermitage was diverted on 19 January 1961 to carry grain to the Democratic Republic of the Congo to help the United Nations combat starvation in that country.

When the presence of Soviet nuclear missiles in Cuba threatened war in October 1962, Hermitage sailed to Guantanamo Bay to transport Marines to that threatened base and underline America's determination to maintain her position there. A second cruise to the Mediterranean from May to October 1963 took Hermitage to Naples, Athens, Genoa, Cannes, Sardinia, Malta, and Rota, Spain as well as other ports in the 6th Fleet's area.

After an assignment in February 1964 to the Caribbean Ready Squadron 12 based in Panama, early in May Hermitage undertook a logistics lift to Bermuda, and Sydney and Halifax, Nova Scotia, and in the fall took part until late November in the Navy-Marine Corps peacetime exercise "Operation Steel Pike I", visiting ports of Málaga and Gibraltar. In June 1965 she participated in a three-month deployment to the Caribbean area during the later stages of the Dominican Republic crisis, making practice amphibious landings at Vieques Island. After completion of overhaul in February 1966 followed by refresher training and amphibious training, Hermitage transported a marine battalion to the Caribbean in May. Through 1967 she continued in her assignment to the Atlantic Fleet.

NDD Ceará (G-30) 
Hermitage was decommissioned on 2 October 1989. She was transferred to the Brazilian Navy as Navio de Desembarque de Doca (Dock Landing Ship) NDD Ceará (G30) the same day. The ship was sold outright to Brazil and struck from the US Naval Vessel Register on 24 January 2001. The name came from one of the Brazilian states which had been used to name a monitor in the late 1800s --Brazilian monitor Ceará—and then a modern mother-ship for submarines built by Italy in the early 1900s.

During her Brazilian Navy service, Ceará undertook sealift missions to transport Brazilian Army and Marine Corps vehicles and supplies between Port-au-Prince and Rio de Janeiro in support of Brazil's MINUSTAH contingent. In the Comissão Haiti XXI voyage in April 2015, the ship suffered 'engine problems' that left her adrift 500 nautical miles away from Belém, off the coast of French Guiana. The ship was eventually towed back to the port of Belém for repairs and her original mission was completed by the Navio de Desembarque de Carros de Combate (Landing Ship, Tank) NDCC Almirante Saboia. While on port, a small scale fire erupted in one of the vessel's habitable compartments, causing no casualties and no significant damage. The ship left Belém in 1 August 2015, arriving in Rio de Janeiro by 27 August.

By March 2016, the Brazilian Navy decided to have the ship decommissioned by the 29th of April that year. In June 2021, the vessel was sunk as part of the live fire exercise Operation Missilex 2021 off the coast of Rio de Janeiro and Cabo Frio, which involved the frigates Liberal and Independência firing their Mark 8s and testing the Brazilian-made MANSUP anti-ship missile, as well as Mk. 82 bombs and strafing runs from A-4 Skyhawk fighters and a Mk. 48 torpedo launched from the submarine Tupi.

References

External links 

USS Hermitage Association

Thomaston-class dock landing ships
Ships built in Pascagoula, Mississippi
1956 ships
Vietnam War amphibious warfare vessels of the United States
Cold War amphibious warfare vessels of the United States
Ceará-class dock landing ships
Amphibious warfare vessels of Brazil